Vasily Vasiliyevich Tsibliyev; born on February 20, 1954) is retired Russian cosmonaut and former head of the Yuri Gagarin Cosmonaut Training Center.

Life
He was selected as a cosmonaut on March 26, 1987. Tsibliyev flew as Commander on Soyuz TM-17 from July 1, 1993 to January 14, 1994 and on Soyuz TM-25 from February 2, 1997 to August 14 of the same year. He retired as a cosmonaut on June 19, 1998.  

From 2003 to 2009, he headed the Yuri Gagarin Cosmonaut Training Center.

Tsibliyev is married with two children.

Tsibliyev was the commander in charge of Mir when it was hit by a Progress spacecraft in 1997.

Honours and awards
 Hero of the Russian Federation (14 January 1994) - for courage and heroism displayed during spaceflight on the orbital scientific research complex Mir
 Order of Merit for the Fatherland, 3rd class (10 April 1998) - for courage and heroism displayed during prolonged space flight on the orbital scientific research complex Mir
 Medal "For Merit in Space Exploration" (12 April 2011) - for the great achievements in the field of research, development and use of outer space, many years of diligent work, public activities
 Medal for Battle Merit
 Medal "For Distinction in Military Service", 2nd class
 Medal "For Strengthening brotherhood in arms" (Bulgaria)
 NASA Exceptional Public Service Medal
 Pilot-Cosmonaut of the Russian Federation (14 January 1994) - for the successful implementation of spaceflight on the orbital scientific research complex Mir and expressed at high level of professionalism
 Prize Laureate Vladimir Vysotsky's "Own Track"

External links
 Yuri Gagarin Cosmonaut Training Center
 Biography and C.V. on GCTC's web site (in Russian).
 Current developments at GCTC: here.
 Onboard video from NASA.
 Biographical note from NASA on Shuttle-Mir program.

1954 births
Living people
People from Kirovske Raion
Russian cosmonauts
Heroes of the Russian Federation
Recipients of the Order "For Merit to the Fatherland", 3rd class
Recipients of the Medal "For Merit in Space Exploration"
Spacewalkers
Mir crew members